Thelma and the Sleaze is an independent all-female, queer southern rock band from Nashville, Tennessee. The group is the brain-child of lead vocalist and guitar player Lauren "LG" Gilbert.

History 
In 2005, Gilbert – who was born in Kankakee, IL but grew up in Kentucky and Iowa – came to Nashville at the age of 21 to study audio engineering. In 2006, Gilbert joined the all-female punk rock band the Trampskirts as a guitar player. Gilbert was in Trampskirts until 2009 when the band dissolved.

In 2010, Gilbert and fellow Trampskirts band members including drummer Jacki Macri and bass player Emily “Baby Angel” Zimmer founded Thelma and the Sleaze. The band's first show was on November 8, 2010 and was themed after the film Thelma and Louise. One member of Trampskirts departed after their first show and then in 2011, drummer Jacki Macri left the band. The band added Indianapolis native Chase “Tender” Noelle on drums and Beth Finney on lead guitar. The lineup of Gilbert, Zimmer, Noelle and Finney debuted on February 7, 2012, opening for Jack White's Black Belles. 

In March 2012, the band recorded the Pillage EP. Shortly thereafter Finney left the band.

In 2012 and 2013 Gilbert, Zimmer and Noelle recorded and produced The Pamela Handerson EP and two other EPs called These Boots Won’t Lick Themselves and Heart Like A Fist. In 2014, Zimmer stepped back from the band. Gilbert and Noelle brought in Reilly “Gigi” Gallagher to play bass on a more aggressive national touring schedule. Gallagher, who attended Belmont University, was in a relationship with Noelle throughout her time in the band.

In early 2015, the live album Greatest Hits Live was released, featuring Gilbert, Noelle and Gallagher. 

In February 2016, the band set out to play a show on every night of the month in Nashville – 31 shows in 29 days. Director Seth Graves filmed the one-city tour, which was released as the documentary, Kandyland: The Movie. During the tour, the band also sold raffle tickets for a chance to win a van.

On March 23, 2016 at a show in Athens, Georgia, Gallagher had an onstage altercation which resulted in her leaving the stage and band in the middle of the concert. Gilbert, Noelle and new organ player Amaia “Coochie Coochie” Aguirre finished the show.

Thelma and the Sleaze has opened for The Eagles of Death Metal, as well as Charles Bradley. In June 2016, Noelle moved to New York City and joined the band Boytoy.

During the last six months of 2016, Gilbert put Thelma and the Sleaze on hiatus. Toward the end of 2016, she lived in Akron, Ohio and made guitar effects pedals at Earthquaker Devices. During this time, Gilbert recorded several songs with friends and that became the Mid-American Drift EP 2016.

In 2017, after several years in the making, the band's first full-length LP Somebody’s Doin’ Something was released. The record included contributions from Brittany Howard (Alabama Shakes), Jade Payne (Aye Nako), and Tristen Gaspadarek, among others. The record release was accompanied by a video called "Secretary".

Thelma and the Sleaze had a rotating tour lineup. Among the musicians regularly used include drummer Shaylee "Snowflake" Walsh, Chloe “Whiskers” Katerndahl, Helen “Shy-anne” Gilley and Aguirre. Touring highlights in 2017 included a run with country duo Birdcloud.

In 2018, Gilbert took on the role of the character of religious church lady Roberta Flatbush in an attempt to raise funds for a van. The social media video series brought in more than $5,000 and the band was able to secure the transportation. At the close of 2018, Gilbert recorded an audio history of the band along with insights on her creative process and how she handles the business of being an independent national touring act for the podcast Queen of Shit Mountain.

Also in 2018, recording began on the second full-length LP Fuck, Marry, Kill. Noelle and Zimmer were brought back in for session work. Thelma and the Sleaze produced, with Loney Hutchins on engineering, and Jim Kissling (Ex Hex, King Tuff, The Dirtbombs, The Go) mixing and mastering the record. Cover art is by Lindsey Cooper.

In August 2019, Fuck, Marry, Kill was released on The What of Whom and Burger Records. The album got positive reviews. As part of the album release, Thelma and the Sleaze were the supporting act on the first two dates of Brittany Howard's new tour.

Band Members 
 Lauren "LG" Gilbert – vocals, guitar
 Amaia "Coochie Coochie" Aguirre – organ/keyboards
 Shaylee "Snowflake" Walsh – drums

Past members
 Beth Finney – lead guitar
 Chase "Tender" Noelle – drums
 Chloe “Whiskers” Katerndahl – bass
 Emily “Baby Angel” Zimmer – bass
 Helen “Shy-anne” Gilley – guitar 
 Jacki Macri – drums
 Reilly "Gigi" Gallagher – bass

Filmography 
 2011: Orca Park Soundtrack – performer as bar band: "Change Your Mind" 
 2015: Nashville – backing band
 2017: Kandyland: The Movie (Documentary) – band

Discography

Albums 
 2017: Somebody's Doin' Something (Last Hurrah Recordings (vinyl) / Burger Records (cassette))
 2019: Fuck. Marry. Kill. (The What of Whom (vinyl) / Burger Records (cassette))

Singles & EPs 
 2012: Be Greedy / Someone's Little Sister and Hollow  by Fuckshow 7-inch split (self released)
 2012: Pillage
 2013: The Pamela Handerson EP (self released)
 2013: These Boots Won't Lick Themselves
 2014: Heart Like A Fist
 2015: Greatest Hits Live
 2016: Greatest Hitz Vol. 1
 2016: Kandyland 7-inch (self-released)
 2016: Where You Belong / Country Life by Dogs of Oz 7-inch (self-released)
 2016: Christmas Sampler 2016
 Untitled cassette single (Cold Lunch Recordings)
 2017: Somebody's Doin' Something - "Secretary / "Why you wanna do that?" (cassingle)
 2018: Lonely Girl / Handyman by Craig Brown Band cassingle (Burger Records)
 2018: Mid-American Drift 2016
 2018: Dirt 7-inch demos of 3 tracks ("Dirt"/"Candy Anne"/"Mary Beth") from Fuck. Marry. Kill. (The What of Whom)
 2019: Pain single (The What of Whom)

References

External links 
 
 Thelma and the Sleaze at The What of Whom
 
 Kandyland film – official website

American southern rock musical groups
Musical groups from Nashville, Tennessee
LGBT-themed musical groups
Musical groups established in 2010
2010 establishments in Tennessee